The DC Universe (DCU) is an American media franchise and shared universe based on characters from DC Comics publications. It was created by James Gunn and Peter Safran, co-chairmen and co-CEOs of DC Studios. The franchise is a soft reboot of the DC Extended Universe (DCEU), a film franchise featuring DC characters. The DCU retains certain cast members and narrative elements of the DCEU while replacing others. In contrast with the previous state of DC Comics adaptations, the DCU features a united continuity and story across live-action films and television, animation, and video games. Concurrent DC adaptations that do not fit within this continuity are labeled DC Elseworlds.

After Discovery Inc. and WarnerMedia merged to become Warner Bros. Discovery (WBD), CEO David Zaslav revealed a plan to revitalize the DC brand following the poor reception of some DCEU films. Gunn and Safran were hired to lead the newly formed DC Studios in November 2022 after working on several DCEU projects, including the film The Suicide Squad (2021) and its spin-off series Peacemaker (2022–present). The pair spent several months with a group of writers developing the overarching story for a new DC continuity, which features a combination of popular and obscure DC characters. Some DCEU projects in development were abandoned in favor of new takes, while others (including Peacemaker) continued within the new franchise. Gunn and Safran wanted to focus on storytelling needs rather than forcing creators to produce their projects before specific release dates.

The story of the DCU is divided into chapters, starting with "Gods and Monsters" which will begin with the undated animated series Creature Commandos. Gunn and Safran considered the chapter's first film, Superman: Legacy (2025), to be the true beginning of the DCU.

Background

DC Extended Universe 
Warner Bros. Pictures was deemed to be "lagg[ing] behind" rival company Marvel Studios and their shared universe of superheroes, the Marvel Cinematic Universe (MCU), by late 2012. Warner Bros. began planning for Man of Steel (2013), based on the DC Comics character Superman, to start their own shared universe, which became known as the "DC Extended Universe" (DCEU). They announced a full slate of DC films in October 2014. Man of Steel director Zack Snyder was set to return for Batman v Superman: Dawn of Justice (2016) and Justice League (2017), and spin-off films were planned for the Justice League members and other DC characters.

Batman v Superman did not meet Warner Bros.' box office expectations, and received negative responses from fans and critics for its dark tone. Warner Bros. felt they could no longer give Snyder the "long leash" he had on Man of Steel and Batman v Superman, and reorganized future DC projects under the new DC Films division. Executive Jon Berg and comic book writer Geoff Johns were set to run DC Films and wanted to make Justice League more optimistic and hopeful. When the studio was not satisfied with their efforts, Joss Whedon was hired to write reshoots for the film. Snyder left the film after the death of his daughter in March 2017, and Whedon completed the film with significant changes. Justice League was another critical and commercial disappointment for Warner Bros., and the studio was again rethinking its approach to DC in late 2017. Berg and Johns left DC Films, and a planned Batman spin-off film was reworked into director Matt Reeves's The Batman (2022), a film separate from the DCEU.

Warner Bros. intended for future DCEU films to be more standalone than their previous interconnected plan. Walter Hamada was appointed the new president of DC Films in January 2018. That October, James Gunn was hired to write and direct The Suicide Squad (2021), a standalone sequel to the earlier DCEU film Suicide Squad (2016) which retained some cast members but otherwise told its own story. He worked with producer Peter Safran, who also produced the DCEU films Aquaman (2018) and Shazam! (2019). In May 2020, Warner Bros. and Snyder announced that his original vision for Justice League would be released on the streaming service HBO Max as Zack Snyder's Justice League (2021). By the end of 2020, Hamada was planning spin-off DCEU television series for HBO Max, including Gunn's The Suicide Squad spin-off Peacemaker (2022–present). At that point, there were around 25 other live-action and animated DC-based series in addition to the various film projects. Hamada planned to connect all of these using the multiverse, which was set to be introduced in The Flash (2023).

Warner Bros. Discovery 
In April 2022, Discovery Inc. and Warner Bros.' parent company WarnerMedia merged to become Warner Bros. Discovery (WBD), led by president and CEO David Zaslav. The new company was expected to restructure DC Entertainment so the film, television, and video game divisions of the company could be aligned. Even before the merger was complete, Zaslav began meeting with candidates to take over DC—including film executive Emma Watts—with the hope of finding an equivalent to Marvel Studios president Kevin Feige. Despite some recent successes with DC films and series, Zaslav and WBD felt DC lacked a "coherent creative and brand strategy" and were underutilizing key characters such as Superman. Hamada was still contracted until 2023, and his supporters felt Zaslav was not giving him enough credit for his DC plans and successes. In June, Zaslav announced that DC Films would be separated from Warner Bros. within the WBD structure but would be overseen by Warner Bros. film chairs Michael De Luca and Pamela Abdy until a new DC head was appointed.

At the start of August, WBD announced that it no longer planned to release the DCEU film Batgirl on HBO Max or theatrically, after deciding that it "simply did not work" and went against Zaslav's mandate to make DC films "big theatrical event films". Soon after, Zaslav said he wanted a new 10-year plan for DC films, and he had enlisted the help of Disney executive Alan F. Horn in finding a new leader for DC. Hamada was reportedly upset by the cancellation of Batgirl and tried to leave DC Films, but was convinced by De Luca and Abdy to stay through the release of Black Adam in October 2022. Around that time, Henry Cavill reprised his role as Superman from Man of Steel for a cameo appearance in Black Adam. This was against Hamada's wishes, and was approved by De Luca and Abdy when they were approached directly by Black Adam star Dwayne Johnson. Johnson began promoting the idea of a Black Adam vs. Superman film co-starring Cavill in the future, and Warner Bros. began pursuing a sequel to Man of Steel starring Cavill. At the end of August, producer Dan Lin emerged as a potential candidate for taking over DC, but exited talks weeks later. Todd Phillips, director of the standalone DC film Joker (2019), was also considered for the role but remained focused on directing the sequel Joker: Folie à Deux (2024).

Development

DC Studios and initial developments 

James Gunn and Peter Safran were announced as the co-chairs and co-CEOs of the newly formed DC Studios at the end of October 2022, and were set to take over from Hamada on November 1. It was considered a shocking and unprecedented decision to have a high-profile director like Gunn move into a top executive position at a film studio. Gunn was expected to focus on the creative side of the company while Safran focused on the business and production side, and their deal was reportedly for four years. Gunn and Safran were both expected to continue directing and producing projects, respectively, in addition to their new roles, though other projects would be exclusively with WBD. They would report directly to Zaslav and work closely with De Luca and Abdy. A week after starting their new roles, the pair said they had begun working with a group of writers to develop an eight-to-ten year plan for the new DC Universe (DCU). Zaslav said they had begun work on a bible for future DC projects that would be finished soon. He also said the new plan would emulate Marvel's model of having a single, unified approach to each character, specifically highlighting new approaches to Batman and Superman. By mid-November, Gunn had already begun writing the script for a new DC film while Safran had been "fixing" the upcoming Aquaman and the Lost Kingdom (2023).

In early December, Gunn and Safran were finalizing their plans ahead of a meeting with Zaslav. It was revealed that Patty Jenkins would no longer be developing a sequel to her DCEU films Wonder Woman (2017) and Wonder Woman 1984 (2020) after being told by Gunn and Safran that such a film did not fit within their new plans. Various rumors about the new plans were circulating at that time, including that the DCU would be a complete reboot of the DCEU that moved away from the actors cast by Snyder, that Matt Reeves's The Batman films would be integrated with the DCU, and that Aquaman actor Jason Momoa would be recast as the character Lobo following Aquaman and the Lost Kingdom. These reveals and rumors led to concerns within the industry and among DC fans about the direction Gunn and Safran were taking the franchise, and Gunn put out a statement saying they "were coming into a fractious environment" and there would be an "unavoidable transitional period as we moved into telling a cohesive story across film, TV, animation and gaming". A week later, Gunn announced that he and Safran had a slate of projects "ready to go" and more details would be provided in 2023, but he did reveal that he was writing a new Superman film that would not star Cavill. Ben Affleck was also confirmed to not be reprising his DCEU Batman role moving forward. Gunn and Safran had discussions with Cavill and Affleck about returning to the DCU to respectively portray a new character and direct a project, although Affleck later stated he was not interested in directing a DCU project.

Chapter One: Gods and Monsters 
In January 2023, the DCU was reported to be a "broad but not blanket reset" of the DCEU. On January 31, Gunn and Safran unveiled the first projects from the DCU slate. They revealed the writers who had been working with them on the overall story for the DCU: Drew Goddard, Jeremy Slater, The Flash writer Christina Hodson, Christal Henry, and comic book writer Tom King. The group had planned two "chapters" of story for the eight-to-ten year plan, with the potential for more chapters after that. The first chapter was titled "Gods and Monsters", with the first five films of the chapter being Superman: Legacy (2025), The Authority, The Brave and the Bold, Supergirl: Woman of Tomorrow, and Swamp Thing, and the first five television series being Creature Commandos, Waller, Lanterns, Paradise Lost, and Booster Gold. Gunn noted that this slate combined DC's "diamond characters", such as Batman, Superman, and Wonder Woman, with lesser known characters who they hoped would become just as popular. Any DC projects that did not fit within the shared universe, such as Joker: Folie a Deux and The Batman – Part II (2025), would be labeled as "DC Elseworlds". Gunn said The Flash would "reset" the DCEU continuity, making the DCU a "soft reboot" that retains certain cast members and elements of the DCEU while replacing others. Gunn and Safran said Viola Davis (Amanda Waller) and John Cena (Peacemaker) would reprise their The Suicide Squad and Peacemaker roles in the DCU, and a "rough memory" of the events of those projects would remain. There was potential for Momoa, Gal Gadot (Wonder Woman), Ezra Miller (The Flash), and Zachary Levi (Shazam) to also reprise their roles, but decisions on those characters had not been made. No actor would be playing multiple characters, so if they did cast Momoa as Lobo he would not portray Aquaman in the DCU. Gunn and Safran expected the same actors to play characters across mediums, including animation.

Safran said they were being flexible with the order each project was released in, though there were some projects key to the overall story that would need to be released in a specific order. He added that they were aiming to release two films and two HBO Max series a year. Gunn felt studios being "beholden to dates" was an industry-wide issue and wanted to focus on getting the screenplays right for each project before putting them into production. He noted that this happened with The Suicide Squad and that film did not require any reshoots unlike other DCEU projects. Comparing the DCU to the MCU, Gunn noted that the latter is mostly set in real world locations such as New York City while DC stories take place in a "fictional universe" with locations including Metropolis, Gotham City, Themyscira, and Atlantis. He added that the DCU would be more planned-out from the beginning than the MCU was due to the group of writers working on the DCU's overall story. They took inspiration for their new universe from the Star Wars franchise, which has "different times, different places, different things", and from the series Game of Thrones (2011–2019) and its morally complex characters. Another distinction from the MCU was that many of the announced DCU projects were based on specific comic book runs and story arcs compared to the MCU approach of taking different elements from throughout Marvel Comics history. The day after the slate announcement, several of those comics appeared on best-selling lists and some had sold out.

Films

Superman: Legacy (2025) 
Although it is not an origin story, the film focuses on a young version of Superman as a reporter interacting with key characters such as Lois Lane, as he goes on a journey to reconcile his Kryptonian heritage with his human family in Smallville, Kansas. Gunn described Superman in the film as "the embodiment of truth, justice and the American way; he's kindness in a world that thinks of kindness as old fashioned". Gunn and Safran considered the film to be the true beginning of the DCU.

After becoming co-CEO of DC Studios on November 1, 2022, Gunn was already writing a new DC film by the middle of that month. In December, he said Superman was a big priority, if not the biggest priority, for DC Studios, before announcing that he was writing a new Superman film with the potential to also direct. When Gunn and Safran unveiled the first projects from their DCU slate in January 2023, the film was revealed to be titled Superman: Legacy and was given a release date of July 11, 2025. Gunn said the film would take specific inspiration from the comic book All-Star Superman (2005–2008) by Grant Morrison and Frank Quitely. Gunn confirmed he would direct in March 2023.

When revealing that he was working on the film, Gunn said it would not star the DCEU's Henry Cavill due to the script focusing on a younger version of Superman.

The Authority 
Gunn described the Authority as a team who thinks "the world is completely broken. And the only way to fix it is to take things into their own hands, whether that means killing people, destroying heads of state, changing governments, you know, whatever they want to do to make the world better". Safran compared the morally complex team to Jack Nicholson's character in A Few Good Men (1992).

When Gunn and Safran unveiled the first projects from their DCU slate in January 2023 they included a film based on the superhero team the Authority which was created by Warren Ellis and Bryan Hitch for the independent comic book publisher WildStorm. WildStorm was acquired by DC Comics and its characters, including the Authority, were introduced to the DC comics continuity in 2011. Similarly, Gunn and Safran intended to include WildStorm's characters in their own DC Universe continuity, starting with the Authority. Gunn said the film was a passion project of his and he had been working on an outline for it with the other DC Studios writers.

Gunn said the film would have connections to Superman.

The Brave and the Bold 
The film explores members of the "Bat-Family", including introducing Batman's son Damian Wayne as a version of Robin. Gunn said the film would be a "strange father and son story" about Batman and Robin.

After Gunn and Safran were hired, Zaslav said of their new plan for the DCU, "There's not going to be four Batmans". In December 2022, Gunn said Batman would be "a big part of the DCU". When Gunn and Safran unveiled the first projects from their DCU slate a month later they included The Brave and the Bold which introduces the DCU version of Batman. Gunn said the film was based on Grant Morrison's 2006 to 2013 run on the comics.

Ben Affleck was confirmed in December 2022 to not be reprising his DCEU role of Batman moving forward. When The Brave and the Bold was announced, Matt Reeves's version of Batman was expected to continue separately from the DCU's version under the DC Elseworlds label.

Supergirl: Woman of Tomorrow 

Described as "a big science fiction epic film" by Gunn, the film contrasts the jaded character Kara Zor-El / Supergirl, who was raised on a chunk of the destroyed planet Krypton and watched everyone around her die, with her cousin Superman who was raised on Earth by loving parents.

When Gunn and Safran unveiled the first projects from their DCU slate in January 2023 they included a film adaptation of the comic book miniseries Supergirl: Woman of Tomorrow (2021–22) by King and Bilquis Evely.

Swamp Thing 
A horror film that explores the "dark origins" of Swamp Thing.

In December 2022, director James Mangold was reported to be interested in working with Gunn and Safran on a DCU project. When the pair unveiled the first projects from their DCU slate in January 2023 they included a new Swamp Thing film. Gunn said it would take specific inspiration from Alan Moore's  1984–85 The Saga of the Swamp Thing comic book run. After the announcement, Mangold posted a picture of Swamp Thing on social media. He was confirmed to be in negotiations to write and direct the film the next day, but was not expected to start work on it until he had completed Indiana Jones and the Dial of Destiny (2023) and a Bob Dylan biopic.

Despite being tonally darker than other DCU projects, Gunn and Safran intended for Swamp Thing to be interconnected with the rest of the DCU.

Television series

Creature Commandos 
Amanda Waller assembles a black ops team of monsters consisting of Rick Flag Sr., Nina Mazursky, Doctor Phosphorus, Eric Frankenstein, the Bride of Frankenstein, G.I. Robot, and Weasel.

In January 2023, Gunn revealed that he was in the middle of writing a new DCU television series. When Gunn and Safran unveiled the first projects from their DCU slate later that month, the first project was Creature Commandos, an animated series for HBO Max based on a black ops team of the same name featuring various monsters from DC Comics. Gunn had already written the seven episodes and the series had started production. It was expected to be released as an "aperitif" for the DCU before Superman: Legacy.

Waller, Weasel, and Flag's son Rick Flag Jr. previously appeared in The Suicide Squad. Viola Davis was confirmed to be reprising her role as Waller from the film and Peacemaker.

Waller 
Following the events of Peacemaker first-season finale, Waller continues the story of Amanda Waller and "Team Peacemaker".

In May 2022, a Peacemaker spin-off series was revealed to be in development featuring Amanda Waller, with Christal Henry writing and serving as executive producer alongside Gunn and Safran. When Gunn and Safran unveiled the first projects from their DCU slate later that month, the second project was Waller, which Gunn said would be a continuation of Peacemaker because that series' second season was delayed while Gunn focused on the rest of the DCU slate. Henry was set as co-showrunner of Waller alongside Jeremy Carver. The series was expected to be released as an "aperitif" for the DCU before Superman: Legacy.

Viola Davis reprises her role as Waller from Peacemaker and the DCEU. Additional Peacemaker cast members will reprise their roles in the series.

Lanterns 
Hal Jordan and John Stewart, two Green Lanterns (intergalactic heroes who wear rings that give them extraordinary powers), investigate a mystery on Earth.

Gunn confirmed in December 2022 that the Green Lantern characters would be an important part of the new DCU. When he and Safran unveiled the first projects from their DCU slate later that month they included Lanterns, a new iteration of a long-in-development Green Lantern series. Safran said the series would be an Earth-based detective story and "a huge HBO-quality event" in the style of the series True Detective (2014–present).

Safran said the mystery that Jordan and Stewart investigate in the series leads into the main storyline for the DCU.

Paradise Lost 
This series is a political drama about the scheming and power struggles on the all-female island of Themyscira before the birth of Wonder Woman.

In December 2022, Jenkins was revealed to no longer be developing a sequel to Wonder Woman and Wonder Woman 1984 after being told by Gunn and Safran that such a film did not fit within their new plans. When Gunn and Safran unveiled the first projects from their DCU slate a month later they included Paradise Lost, which they compared to Game of Thrones (2011–2019). The title is similar to "Paradise Island Lost", a comic book story arc by Phil Jimenez and George Pérez about a civil war on Themyscira.

Booster Gold 
Mike Carter / Booster Gold is a disgraced former football star in the 25th century who travels back in time to pose as a superhero using basic future technology.

When Gunn and Safran unveiled the first projects from their DCU slate in January 2023 they included Booster Gold, an "outright comedy" series set in the DCU.

Other series 
HBO Max announced a second season of Peacemaker in February 2022, with Gunn set to write and direct all episodes. He said it would explore the repercussions, good and bad, of the first season's events. When Gunn and Safran unveiled the first projects from their DCU slate in January 2023, they said Waller was being worked on instead of Peacemaker second season because Gunn was busy writing Superman: Legacy. In February, Gunn confirmed that Peacemaker was not canceled and said work on the second season would continue after Waller had been made.

Video games 
After announcing the initial DCU projects, Gunn confirmed plans to include new video games in the DCU's shared storyline and said these games would be used to tell new stories that could bridge the gap between films and series. They were also being developed so audiences who do not play video games would not lose any overall story elements. He expected the games to take around four years to make.

DC Elseworlds 

When announcing the first projects for the DCU in January 2023, Gunn said any project that did not fit into the DCU's shared universe would be labeled as "DC Elseworlds" moving forward. This is the same as how DC Comics uses the Elseworlds imprint to mark comic books that are separate from the main continuity. Safran said there was a high bar that non-DCU projects would have to meet in order to be greenlit.

The following projects have been confirmed as part of the "DC Elseworlds" label:
 The animated series Teen Titans Go! (2013–present)
 Director Todd Phillips's films Joker (2019) and Joker: Folie à Deux (2024)
 The animated series Harley Quinn (2019–present)
 The live-action series Superman & Lois (2021–present)
 Director Matt Reeves's Batman shared universe:
 Films The Batman (2022) and The Batman – Part II (2025), as well as an in-development third The Batman film
 Spin-off series The Penguin, as well as in-development series featuring Arkham Asylum and the Gotham City Police Department
 A planned Black-led Superman film written by Ta-Nehisi Coates
 A planned sequel to the film Constantine (2005) with director Francis Lawrence and star Keanu Reeves returning

See also 
 List of films based on DC Comics publications
 List of television series based on DC Comics publications

References

External links 
 Movies on DC.com
 TV series on DC.com

Continuity (fiction)
DC Comics franchises
Fictional universes
Films based on DC Comics
Television shows based on DC Comics
Warner Bros. franchises